Jacky St. James (born October 15, 1976) is an American pornographic film director, screenwriter and publicist for the studio New Sensations. She also directs for Bellesa Films.

Early life
St. James grew up within the Washington metropolitan area in Northern Virginia. She was raised Catholic.

St. James has a Bachelor of Arts degree in Theatre with a concentration in Film. At age 27, she moved to Los Angeles to pursue a career in the mainstream entertainment industry. She worked as an actress in films and television shows and has directed small mainstream projects as well. She also worked in online advertising for over 13 years.

Career
In May 2010, a friend of St. James, who is a director of photography, sent her a clip of The Wedding Day from the New Sensations Romance Series because he was impressed by the quality of the film. After researching The Romance Series, she discovered that New Sensations was doing a writing contest for the series. Adult film director Eddie Powell gave her advice on how to write a porn script after she contacted him on Twitter. She entered the contest in 2011 and her script, Dear Abby, won. Powell directed the film and New Sensations released it in June 2011. St. James also won Best Screenplay for the film at the 2012 AVN Awards.

Some of St. James's most notable works are Torn, The Temptation of Eve, and The Submission of Emma Marx (including three sequels). She co-directed Torn with Eddie Powell and it won the AVN Award for Best Romance Release in 2013, the year in which the category was first created. In 2014, The Temptation of Eve and The Submission of Emma Marx won AVN Awards for Best Romance Movie and Best BDSM Movie, respectively. That same year, St. James began to direct mostly for Digital Sin's Tabu Tales, a line with plots featuring sex between stepfamily members. In 2014, she became only the second woman after Stormy Daniels to win an XRCO Award as Best Director (Feature), an honor she could retain in the following two years. In 2015 and 2016, she also received the XBIZ Award for Director of the Year – Body of Work. The 2015 sequel The Submission of Emma Marx 2: Boundaries won her two more screenplay awards, an AVN and XBIZ Award. In 2016, she co-created a Showtime erotic series, Submission with Paul Fishbein. Since 2019, Jacky St. James has been also directing movies for site Bellesa Films, including their imprint Bellesa House.

Awards and nominations

References

External links
 
 
 

1976 births
21st-century American actresses
Actresses from Virginia
American film actresses
American pornographic film directors
American publicists
American television actresses
American women screenwriters
Film directors from Virginia
Living people
People from the Washington metropolitan area
Women pornographic film directors